Dheeraj, also spelled Dhiraj, is a male given name of Sanskrit origin meaning patience.

Dhiraj Deshmukh, Indian politician from Maharashtra and member of Maharashtra legislative assembly
Dheeraj Dhoopar, Indian actor.
Dheeraj Hinduja, Indian businessman.
Dheeraj Kumar, Indian actor.
Dheeraj Sarna, Indian actor.
Dheeraj Sharma (professor)
Dheeraj Sharma (filmmaker)
Dheeraj Singh Moirangthem, Football player

Hindu given names
Indian masculine given names